Ham is a commune in the Somme department in Hauts-de-France, northern France.

Geography
Ham (Somme) station has rail connections to Amiens, Saint-Quentin and Laon. The nearby villages of Estouilly and Saint-Sulpice joined the commune of Ham in 1965 and 1966 respectively.

Population

The population data given in the table and graph below for 1962 and earlier refer to the commune of Ham excluding Estouilly and Saint-Sulpice.

History
Mentioned for the first time in 932 as a possession of the seigneur Erard, junior member of the Counts of Ponthieu. The town was later conquered by the Counts of Vermandois in the 12th century. In the 14th century it was owned by a family from Ham itself.  From April 7 to June 3, 1917, Ham was home to the Lafayette Escadrille

The Castle of Ham

The first stone ramparts were put up in the 13th century by the local nobleman, Odon IV. 
In the 15th century, the château was transformed into a formidable fortress by John II of Luxembourg, Count of Ligny 
In 1465, John's nephew, Louis of Luxembourg, built a huge donjon, 33m high, 33m in diameter with walls 11m thick In 1917, German forces blew up much of the château. All that remains are the entrance tower and vestiges of the donjon and ramparts.

Personalities
 Francis de Bourbon, Count of St. Pol, Duke of Estouteville was born at Ham in 1491
 General Maximilien Sebastien Foy was born at Ham in 1775
 Jacques Cassard, intrepid sailor, was imprisoned at the château of Ham from 1726 to 1740.
 Louis Napoleon Bonaparte, accused of plotting against the state, was imprisoned at the château of Ham from 1840 to 1846, when he escaped, disguised as a worker, carrying a plank on his shoulder.
 Léon Accambray, French politician
 Jean-Charles Peltier, physicist and meteorologist
 Jean-Baptiste-Henri du Trousset de Valincourt (1643–1730), biographer of Louis XIV

Twin towns
 Eisfeld, Germany

See also
Communes of the Somme department

References

External links

 Ham, Official municipal website
 Château of Ham
 Article and photos about the château of Ham

Communes of Somme (department)
Somme communes articles needing translation from French Wikipedia
Picardy